Senator Galvin may refer to:

Michael J. Galvin (1907–1963), Massachusetts State Senate
Owen A. Galvin (1852–1897), Massachusetts State Senate